Paola Caselli (born 1966) is an Italian astronomer and astrochemist known for her research on molecular clouds, star formation and planet formation, and the astrochemistry behind the materials found within the Solar System. She is the director of the Max Planck Institute for Extraterrestrial Physics near Munich in Germany. She also holds an honorary professorship at Ludwig Maximilian University of Munich.

Education and career
Caselli was born on 26 July 1966 in Follonica, Italy, and as a teenager was inspired to work in space science and molecular clouds by a teacher who gave her Fred Hoyle's 1957 science fiction novel The Black Cloud to read. She earned a laurea in astronomy and physics in 1990, from the University of Bologna, and completed her Ph.D. there in 1994.

After postdoctoral research at the Center for Astrophysics  Harvard & Smithsonian, she became a researcher at the Arcetri Observatory in Florence, Italy, in 1996, and remained there until 2005. For the next two years she was a visiting scholar at the University of California, Berkeley and at Harvard University. in 2007 she became a professor of astronomy at the University of Leeds, and in 2011 became head of astrophysics at Leeds. She joined the Max Planck Institute for Extraterrestrial Physics as its director in 2014.

While continuing at the Max Planck Institute, she has also held temporary positions as Hasselblad Guest Professor at the Onsala Space Observatory in Sweden and as Blaauw Professor at the University of Groningen in the Netherlands.

References

1966 births
Living people
Italian astronomers
Italian women scientists
Astrochemists
University of Bologna alumni
Academics of the University of Leeds
Max Planck Society people
Max Planck Institute directors